Homeville is a small unincorporated community in Sussex County, Virginia, United States.

Chester Plantation

Chester, purchased by Captain William Harrison (1747-1822) in 1787, and fought in the American Revolution is located near Homeville. Chester is noteworthy architecturally for its huge double chimneys joined on two levels by connecting closets. Its interior woodwork has also survived.  Chester is listed on the National Register of Historic Places.

References

Unincorporated communities in Sussex County, Virginia
Unincorporated communities in Virginia